Prof. Michael Luck is a computer scientist based at the Department of Computer Science, King's College London, in central London, England. He leads the Agents and Intelligent Systems (AIS) section.

From 1993 to 2000, Michael Luck was based in the Department of Computer Science                  at the University of Warwick. From 2000 to 2006, Luck was a professor in the School of Electronics and Computer Science                  at the University of Southampton. He has led the AgentLink European Co-ordination Action for Agent-Based Computing.

Luck has undertaken research in the area of intelligent agents. He is the co-author of the books Understanding Agent Systems and Agent-Based Software Development.

See also 
 AgentSpeak, an agent-oriented programming language
 Distributed Multi-Agent Reasoning System (dMARS), a platform for intelligent agents

References

External links 
 Michael Luck home page
 

Year of birth missing (living people)
Living people
British computer scientists
Computer science writers
Academics of the University of Warwick
Academics of the University of Southampton
Academics of King's College London